Curb feelers or curb finders are springs or wires installed on a vehicle which act as "whiskers" to alert drivers when they are at the right distance from the curb while parking. 

The devices are fitted low on the body, close to the wheels. As the vehicle approaches the curb, the protruding feelers scrape against the curb, making a noise and alerting the driver in time to avoid damaging the wheels or hubcaps. The feelers are manufactured to be flexible and do not break easily.

Hotrods
Curb feelers are still used on some hot rods when a 1950s look is wanted. They are especially popular for cars with whitewall tires, which are easily marred when scraped against the curb. Sometimes curb feelers are found only on the passenger side of the car, since that is most commonly near the curb when parking. Sometimes they are added only next to the front wheels. Some curb feelers have a single wire or spring, while others have two to increase the area that can be protected. Any particular car may have just one curb feeler installed (as on the pictures) or more if attached near the front and rear, as well as on both sides of the vehicle.

Recreational vehicles
Recreational vehicles sometimes have rubber feelers or metal, antenna-like rods mounted on the lower part of the body that act as feelers so that drivers are warned if they are approaching a curb or other obstruction, thus reducing the chances of gouging or even cutting the tire sidewalls and generally increasing the safety of vehicle operation.

Buses
Buses are sometimes fitted with curb feelers, which can assist the driver in ensuring that the bus is close enough to the curb to allow passengers to step to and from the curb easily.

Heavy equipment
Today, the U.S. Department of Labor Mine Safety and Health Administration mentions that users of heavy equipment can benefit from an analogous accessory:

This will give a warning nudge to anyone in the danger area, giving him or her about a  running start to stop the machine or to yell at the operator to stop. The belting is stiff enough to hold its shape but flexible enough to give if it runs into a miner or vice versa. The flexibility also allows this "curb feeler" to drag against the rib or be smacked by a shuttle car with little or no damage. A little spray from a can of reflective paint will make the belt a visual warning device as well. One or two on each corner will help or put as many as you want.

Electronic sensors
Curb feelers based on optical technology are designed to function the same way but work in the proximity of an obstruction rather than having to come into physical contact with it. As described by one United States patent:

An electronic curb feeler system uses two pairs of optical sensor units to detect an object located near the front end of a vehicle during parking. One pair of optical sensor units detects an object directly in front of a left portion of the front end of the vehicle while another pair of optical sensors detects an object directly in front of a right portion of the front end of the vehicle. By supplying the operator of the vehicle with the location of the object as well as the exact distance the object is from the front end of the vehicle the operator can avoid hitting the object while parking very close to the object.

Devices such as this, and simpler electronic devices similar to the original wire curb feelers used on cars, are used in the design of various mobile robotic devices. One robotics company that does work for the United States Department of Defense uses laser-assisted curb feeler technology.

See also
 Fender skirts

References

Automotive accessories
Springs (mechanical)